Shaun Dingwall (born 21st February) is a British actor. He is known for his extensive roles on stage and screen.

He was born in London and attended the prestigious Central School of Speech and Drama.

Dingwall has played leading roles in many television series such as the highly acclaimed BBC series Noughts and Crosses, the BAFTA and EMMY award-winning film Responsible Child and most recently the highly popular and acclaimed Netflix series Top Boy. 

His highly extensive credits include the BAFTA winning BBC One serial Charles II: The Power and the Passion (as Thomas Osborne, Earl of Danby), directed by Joe Wright. He also appeared in another period drama, the BBC adaptation of Crime and Punishment, as Rhazhumikin. He played the recurring character Pete Tyler in the revival of Doctor Who. One of Dingwall's earlier roles was as Lance Corporal Steve Evans in Soldier Soldier. He later played Major Godber in another BAFTA winner, the Channel 4 film Mark of Cain, and was a burglar in The Phoenix and the Carpet (1997). 

Dingwall was a regular in ITV's series of police thriller serials, Touching Evil, from 1997 to 1999. In 2000 he appeared as James Freeman in the BBC epic serial In a Land of Plenty. In 2004 he appeared in a guest role as Lenny, a hippy criminologist in BBC Two's adaptation of The Long Firm written by Joe Penhall, and as Scipio Africanus in the 2006 BBC docu-drama Hannibal.

In 2007, Dingwall appeared in the BBC television film Learners also directed by Francesca Joseph

In 2008, he played David Grant, Abby's husband, in the re-imagined BBC series Survivors.

In January 2009 he appeared in the TV drama Above Suspicion as DI Mike Lewis. Since January 2010 he has appeared as Reg Trotter in three episodes of Rock & Chips, a prequel to the long-running series Only Fools and Horses.

In August 2011, Dingwall appeared as Detective Superintendent Stuart Barlow in New Tricks on BBC One. In 2014, he appeared in The Driver.

From 2016 onward he has played Inspector Janvier in Maigret, starring Rowan Atkinson.

In 2019, Dingwall reprised his role of Pete Tyler in Big Finish's audio drama "Rose Tyler: The Dimension Cannon" alongside  Billie Piper and Camille Coduri.

He received acclaim for his performance in the 2019 BBC drama Responsible Child - "Shaun Dingwall perfectly captures the bitter toxicity... slashing and burning ... thriving on the terror he causes...".

In 2020, Dingwall appeared in the BBC series Noughts + Crosses as the Nought militia leader, Jack Dorn.

Film
Dingwall's film career began with a small role in Second Best playing the same character as William Hurt. Dingwall portrayed a younger version of the character Graham in several flashback scenes. The film was directed by Academy Award winner Chris Menges and also stars John Hurt. This was followed by Villa Des Roses where Dingwall played Richard Grunewald, the German artist who wins the heart of Louise Creteur, played by Julie Delpy. The film is an adaptation of the well-known Belgian novel, and went on to win the Best Feature award at the 2002 Hollywood Film Festival.

Dingwall also played Kevin in the BBC film Tomorrow La Scala!. The film was a huge hit at the Cannes Film Festival but did not receive a theatrical release. (The film was directed by Francesca Joseph, with whom Dingwall later worked on Learners.)

Other appearances in films include On A Clear Day, Colour Me Kubrick, Someone Else and Hush. He is also known for his work in The Young Victoria (2009) and Moses Jones (2009).

He recently appeared in Goodbye Christopher Robin (2017) as Alfred Brockwell, the soon-to-be husband of nanny Olive "Nou" Rand, played by Kelly Macdonald.

Theatre
Shaun Dingwall has appeared in London's West End several times. He appeared in The Man Who Had All the Luck at the Donmar Warehouse as Gus, the enigmatic Austrian mechanic in search of the American dream. This was Dingwall's second time at the Donmar. He appeared there in Beautiful Thing in 1995 playing Ste. Other appearances have included Joey in Incomplete and Random Acts of Kindness at the Royal Court and Achilles in Troilus and Cressida at the Old Vic. In 2004 Dingwall fulfilled a lifelong ambition by playing Hotspur in Henry IV, Part 1 at the Bristol Old Vic.

References

External links

1970 births
Alumni of the Royal Central School of Speech and Drama
British male film actors
British male stage actors
British male television actors
Living people
English people of Scottish descent
20th-century British male actors
21st-century British male actors
People from London